The Thomas More College of Liberal Arts is a private Roman Catholic liberal arts college in Merrimack, New Hampshire. It emphasizes classical education in the Catholic intellectual tradition and is named after Saint Thomas More. It is accredited by the New England Commission of Higher Education. It is endorsed by The Newman Guide to Choosing a Catholic College.

History

Founding

Thomas More College was founded in 1978, with political science professor Peter Sampo as its first president. Sampo had been a co-founder and president of both Cardinal Newman College in St. Louis and Magdalen College, also in New Hampshire. The curriculum, designed by educators Donald and Louise Cowan, associated with the University of Dallas, centered on the direct reading of foundational works of Western culture.

Since 2009
In 2009, the curriculum was revised under president William Fahey to improve its chronological approach to topics and strengthen the presentation of Catholic themes.
Distinct majors in literature, political science, and philosophy were phased out in favor of a unified liberal arts major, great books program.

In the same year regional accrediting body the New England Association of Schools and Colleges placed the college on probation for two years on the ground that it was not meeting NEASC's standards for financial resources. The college improved its financial position, and the period of probation ended in 2011.

In late 2013, the college bought a 1908 mansion in the Nashville Historic District of Nashua. College president William Fahey indicated plans to use the historic house, originally built by shoe manufacturer Frank Anderson and later the home of Mount Saint Mary Seminary, a girls' high school, as an educational site and eventually also a dormitory.

Presidents
 Peter V. Sampo, 1978–2006
 Jeffrey Nelson, 2006–2009
 William Fahey, 2009–present

Academics

Thomas More College of Liberal Arts offers one degree program: Bachelor of Arts in Liberal Arts. The college is accredited by the New England Commission of Higher Education. In 2010, the college started a program of teaching students practical skills in art and music, using the medieval guild system as a model.

For admissions, Thomas More College accepts the Classic Learning Test (CLT) as alternatives to the SAT and ACT.

Since 2012, the American Council of Trustees and Alumni included Thomas More College of Liberal Arts in its What Will They Learn? study. The study assigns a letter grade to 1,070 universities based on how many of the following seven core subjects are required, according to its specific criteria: composition, literature, foreign language, American history, economics, mathematics, and science. Thomas More College was one of 21 schools to receive an "A" grade, a grade assigned to schools that include at least six of the seven subjects—Thomas More College includes all seven subjects.

Curriculum 
Thomas More College offers one degree, B.A. degree in Liberal Arts without a major concentration. The core curriculum is a Great Books program, and the program of studies is shaped according the traditional order of learning. The first two years of the four-year program are dedicated to the Trivium (logic, rhetoric, and grammar) and the Quadrivium (geometry, astronomy, arithmetic, and music). Students read great works of Western literature, philosophy, and political science instead of textbooks. Not all texts are considered to be of equal importance as some are masterworks and others are opinion pieces—because of this students read some texts in their entirety and excerpts from others. Students are also required to study a semester in Rome; this is done in the second semester of sophomore year.

Natural science, philosophy, scripture, and theology are all required courses. Over the four years, a Thomas More student might write upward of sixty papers assigned in the various subject areas. In their third year, students must present a junior project in front of a panel of three faculty members; in their fourth year, students produce a senior thesis and defend it before faculty and student peers.

Rankings
 From 2012 to 2021, the college was awarded an "A" rating from the education reform organization American Council of Trustees and Alumni.

 In 2021, the Young America's Foundation named Thomas More College one of the top Conservative schools in the United States.
 Thomas More College is endorsed by the Cardinal Newman Society, publisher of The Newman Guide to Choosing a Catholic College (2021).

The Center for the Restoration of Christian Culture 

In 2017, Thomas More College of Liberal Arts launched the Center for the Restoration of Christian Culture. In order to restore Christian culture in New England, the center has hosted several lectures and online webinars. Dr. Robert Royal, president of the Washington, D.C.-based Faith and Reason Institute, said the center is "one of the most promising new initiatives in decades."

Publishing
The college has sponsored the Centre for Faith and Culture at Oxford, England, publisher of Second Spring, a journal on faith and culture, since 2007.

In April 2011, Thomas More College, together with Holy Spirit College in Atlanta, reached an agreement with the non-profit publisher Sophia Institute Press, which became the publishing division of the two colleges. The two colleges, in turn, appoint representatives to the board of directors of Sophia Institute.

In 2016, the college began its own publishing initiative, called the Thomas More College Press. To date the Thomas More College Press publishes the major works of Aristotle, as translated by Hippocrates Apostle, as well as books by Romano Guardini, John Senior, and Heinrich Rommen.

Notable faculty
Current notable faculty

 Joseph Pearce,  St. John Henry Newman Visiting Chair in Catholic Studies

Former faculty
 Louise Cowan (1916–2015), professor of English
 Anthony Esolen, professor of English Renaissance and classical literature, translator of Dante
 Robert Royal, Catholic author and the president of the Faith & Reason Institute
 Peter V. Sampo (1931–2020), political science professor and first president of the college

See also 

 Great Books
 Thomas Aquinas College
 St. John's College
 Shimer College
 Wyoming Catholic College

References

External links

 
Liberal arts colleges in New Hampshire
Educational institutions established in 1978
Universities and colleges in Hillsborough County, New Hampshire
Catholic universities and colleges in New Hampshire
Roman Catholic Diocese of Manchester
Merrimack, New Hampshire